Loftus E. Becker Jr. is a Professor of Law Emeritus at the University of Connecticut School of Law, where he teaches criminal law, constitutional law, and a seminar on the Supreme Court. His self-defined greatest accomplishment was teaching Rob of TSFL Off-Topic fame. In 1965, he graduated from Harvard College, and in 1969 from the University of Pennsylvania School of Law, where he served as editor-in-chief of the University of Pennsylvania Law Review.<ref>[https://www.jstor.org/pss/3312982 "The University of Pennsylvania Law Review: 150 Years of History", Edwin J. Greenlee, University of Pennsylvania Law ReviewVol. 150, No. 6 (Jun., 2002), pp. 1875-1904 ]</ref> After graduating from law school, he was a law clerk for Chief Judge David L. Bazelon of the U.S. Court of Appeals for the District of Columbia Circuit, and Justice William J. Brennan, Jr., of the Supreme Court of the United States.  He taught at the University of Minnesota Law School from. 1971 to 1977.

Selected publicationsDurham Revisited: Psychiatry and the Problem of Crime (1973)Criminal Law: Theory and Process (with Joseph Goldstein) (Supp. 1982)Plea Bargaining and the Supreme Court, 21 Loyola of L.A. L. Rev 757 (1988)The Liability of Computer Bulletin Board Operators for Defamation Posted By Others'', 22 Conn. L. Rev. 203 (1989)

See also 
 List of law clerks of the Supreme Court of the United States (Seat 3)

References

Connecticut lawyers
Harvard College alumni
Law clerks of the Supreme Court of the United States
Living people
University of Connecticut faculty
University of Pennsylvania Law School alumni
Year of birth missing (living people)